The Webventures of Justin and Alden is an American comedy web series co-created and produced by Wilson Cleveland, Sandeep Parikh, Dominik Rausch and Illeana Douglas, who all make appearances in the show.   The series, sponsored by Trident in association with the Streamy Awards debuted on My Damn Channel on April 27, 2010 with an introduction from Grace Helbig as well as on CollegeHumor, YouTube and Atom.com (later acquired by Comedy Central).

Premise 
The fictional series takes place on April 11, 2010 - the day of the real-life 2nd Annual Streamy Awards. Justin Tyler and Alden Ford play struggling actors who write a web series script and road trip across Los Angeles to crash The Streamy Awards and convince Felicia Day to be the star of their show.

Reception 

Despite the negative response and controversy surrounding the live The 2nd Annual Streamy Awards event, Webventures received generally favorable reviews from critics. In her April 29, 2010 review, USA Today critic Whitney Matheson called Webventures a "delightful new show" that "includes parodies of several popular web series, including The Guild and Dr. Horrible. Adweek's Todd Wasserman complained, "Webventures contains no LOL moments," but "the moment when Tyler breaks the fourth wall is somewhat risible."

The series was nominated for Best Branded Entertainment series at the 2011 Banff World Media Festival.

Episodes

References

External links

 
 

American comedy web series
YouTube original programming